Brivezac (Limousin: Brivasac) is a former commune in the Corrèze department in central France. On 1 January 2019, it was merged into the commune Beaulieu-sur-Dordogne.

Population

See also
Communes of the Corrèze department

References

Former communes of Corrèze
Corrèze communes articles needing translation from French Wikipedia
Populated places disestablished in 2019